Kawashimogawa Dam  is a rockfill dam located in Hyogo Prefecture in Japan. The dam is used for water supply. The catchment area of the dam is 27.8 km2. The dam impounds about 21  ha of land when full and can store 2750 thousand cubic meters of water. The construction of the dam was started on 1972 and completed in 1977.

See also
List of dams in Japan

References

Dams in Hyogo Prefecture